"Numb" is a song by rock band U2. It is the third track from their 1993 album Zooropa and was released in June 1993 as the album's first single. The song features a monotonous mantra of "don't" commands spoken by guitarist the Edge amidst a backdrop of various sound effects and samples. The noisy composition and lyrical concept for "Numb" were inspired by the theme of sensory overload, which had prominently been incorporated into the Zoo TV Tour. Lead singer Bono and drummer Larry Mullen Jr. provided backing vocals on the track.

"Numb" originated as a discarded song from the Achtung Baby recording sessions called "Down All the Days". While recording Zooropa, the band transformed the song with mixing assistance from co-producer Flood, the addition of keyboards and samples by co-producer Brian Eno, and the addition of the Edge's monotone vocals. The song was released as a VHS single, featuring music videos directed by Kevin Godley and Emergency Broadcast Network, respectively, but it did not attain widespread commercial success. U2 added "Numb" to their live set lists after resuming their Zoo TV Tour in May 1993, but like most songs on Zooropa it has never been performed live since the end of that tour.

Recording and production
"Numb" originated as a discarded song from the Achtung Baby sessions called "Down All the Days" (later released in the premium editions of Achtung Babys 20th anniversary reissue) that was recorded with producer Daniel Lanois at Berlin's Hansa Studios. The band was not fond of the track—Zooropa co-producer Flood, who was engineer for the Achtung Baby sessions, said it was "quite a ballady song and in the end it was decided that it didn't fit" on that record. Guitarist the Edge said, "It almost worked," calling it a "quite unhinged electronic backing track with a very traditional melody and lyrics" sung by lead vocalist Bono.

During the Zooropa sessions of February–May 1993, U2 revisited the song. At Windmill Lane Studios, producer Brian Eno began working with a stereo submix of the Berlin version, containing guitar, bass, bass pedals and drums, that Flood had created. Eno added about six or seven tracks of keyboards to the submix, mostly samples and strings from a Yamaha DX7 synthesiser. Some of the samples included Arabic voices and congas. According to Flood, "The idea of his overdubs was to make up music out of non-musical noises, like loops of pieces of dialogue and video samples." The Edge called Eno's additions "fantastic".

The song's biggest contribution came while the band were organizing the final running order for Zooropa. The Edge spent several hours in another studio with the mix, experimenting with ideas; eventually adding vocals in a monotone, almost rapped delivery. He said that writing the lyrics "came very quickly", and that he wrote so many lyrics that two verses had to be cut from the song. His vocals were recorded at Westland Studios in Dublin, where the band spent one day for the album sessions. Flood subtly added gating to his voice "to turn the level down when he wasn't singing." The addition of the Edge's vocals, for the most part, completed "Numb".

Bono and drummer Larry Mullen Jr. provided backing vocals. Flood treated Bono's vocals with heavy reverb to complement his "falsetto soul voice", while Mullen provided two tracks of backing vocals, one with a falsetto and one with his natural singing voice. After the vocals were overdubbed, Flood and the Edge mixed the track at Westland Studios. The Edge described it as "a few hours' work and a lot of editing", but said the mixing was "the easiest thing in the world" Flood concurred, calling the mixing "very straightforward". A sample of a Walkman cassette player rewinding was accidentally recorded onto the audio tapes, but the group liked the sound and looped it throughout the song. The final mix comprised about 15 or 16 audio tracks.

Composition
"Numb" runs for 4:20 (4 minutes, 20 seconds). According to Hal Leonard Corporation’s sheet music published at Musicnotes.com, it is played in common time at a tempo of 91 beats per minute. It is an industrial rock-influenced song featuring a noisy backdrop of sampled, rhythmic noises, including "arcade sounds", and a Walkman rewinding. One of the samples is from Leni Riefenstahl's 1935 propaganda film Triumph of the Will of a Hitler Youth boy playing a bass drum; a video clip of the sample was used as on-screen imagery during future concerts on the band's Zoo TV Tour. The Edge sings lead vocals, providing a monotone list of "don't" commands: "Don't move / Don't talk out of time / Don't think / Don't worry / Everything's just fine." Mullen's backing vocals were the first occasion that he sang on a U2 song. Bono contributed "Fat Lady" falsetto vocals, which he provided on other Zooropa songs, as well. "Numb"s various sounds were meant to "recreate that feeling of sensory overload", a theme prevalent on the Zoo TV Tour. Similarly, the Edge's lyrics "tapped into many of the ideas behind Zoo TV, the sense that we were being bombarded by so much information that you find yourself shutting down and unable to respond."

Release
"Numb" was an unlikely choice for a first single, and was released in an even more unlikely format, a video single. Though Madonna had already released "Justify My Love" as a video single in 1990 following the blacklisting of that video by MTV, and had existed a decade before with the Human League's 1983 video single, it was an unusual release mode for the early 1990s; DVD singles became commonplace by the latter part of the decade.

A remix of "Numb" appeared in the 1995 movie Showgirls. This song was also remixed by producer Mike Hedges for U2's compilation release for the 1990s, The Best of 1990-2000.

Critical reception
Stephen Thomas Erlewine from AllMusic called the song a wonderful moment from the album, noting the Edge's "droning mantra". Larry Flick from Billboard wrote, "Don't be startled ... that's the Edge's lead vocal on this first cut lifted from the chameleon-like band's new "Zooropa" album. A dense, Euro-pop groove percolates underneath understated, but slicing guitar riffs and a carnival-style keyboard line. Bono's falsetto musings can be caught swirling in the background, while the Edge's delivery is more akin to synth chords than proper singing. Wonderfully adventurous as a splash of cold, refreshing water on blahblah album-rock and alternative formats. Aaah!" Alan Jones from Music Week noted the "rare starring vocal" by the vocalist on the "appositely named" song. People Magazine said that songs like "Numb" "are too minimal for their own good".

Music video
 
The main music video was directed by Kevin Godley. It features the Edge staring straight into the camera sitting under a dripping tap, while strange things happen to him, such as having feet put on his face, being tied down by the other group members, and belly dancer Morleigh Steinberg performing in front of him.

The video remix was produced by the performance group Emergency Broadcast Network and features, apart from a different performance from the Edge, a number of television and film clips making up much of the industrial beat of the song. The video and sound segments from the video remix were eventually incorporated into the band's live performances of the song on the Zoo TV Tour. The video remix was performed live at the 1993 MTV Video Music Awards in Los Angeles, with only the Edge and multiple video screens on stage.

The commercial single itself was released in video format only on VHS, echoing the television theme from their Zoo TV Tour although limited copies of promotional vinyl and CDs do exist. The video was placed at #16 on NME’s list of "50 Worst Music Videos Ever", but was also described by Stylus Magazine as "sublimely bizarre".

Parodies
VH1 parodied the video for Numb as a promo for The New WKRP in Cincinnati.  Richard Sanders (aka Les Nessman) sat in Edge's place and rambled out the lyrics to the show's opening theme song much the same way Edge does the lyrics to Numb, while the rest of the show's cast did the odd, random things to him.
Parody musician "Weird Al" Yankovic performed a parody of the song called "Green Eggs and Ham" on television while donning a hat similar to the Edge's, sitting in front of a black background, and reciting verses from the book Green Eggs and Ham as the song's lyrics while having the strange things from the original video happen to him. Yankovic originally planned for "Green Eggs and Ham" to be featured on his 1996 album Bad Hair Day, but he was unable to get permission from Dr. Seuss' estate.
Irish children's TV puppet Dustin the Turkey released a parody of the song in 1994.
Mike Myers and Dana Carvey, in character as Wayne and Garth respectively, inserted themselves into the video on a 1993 MTV special promoting the upcoming Wayne's World 2. Garth stared straight into the camera and was lipsynching Edge's part, while Wayne performs various gags using Garth's head.
French Canadian comedians Les Bleu Poudres made a French language parody of the video, entitled "Bum".
In the Philippines, the music channel, Myx parodied the video to promote their 24-hour U2 marathon. The video stars the Myx VJs (Luis Manzano, Nikki Gil and Iya Villana).
In the music video to their song "Alles nur geklaut" from 1993, the German band Die Prinzen parodied several international music videos, including Numb. The song's fictional lyrics are about a musician who confesses their success is based on music plagiarism. In 2021, Die Prinzen collaborated with the German band Deine Freunde and released a new version of the song along with a new music video that parodies the same music videos as the original from 1993 did.
The music video was riffed on by Beavis and Butt-Head, with Butt-Head notably remarking that the song should've been titled "Dumb".

Track listing

Personnel
Bono – backing vocals
The Edge – electric guitars, synthesizers, lead vocals
Adam Clayton – bass guitar
Larry Mullen Jr. – drums, percussion, backing vocals
Additional personnel
Brian Eno – synthesisers, arcade sounds

Charts

Weekly charts

Year-end charts

See also
List of covers of U2 songs - Numb

References
Footnotes

Bibliography

 

1993 singles
U2 songs
List songs
Island Records singles
Music videos directed by Kevin Godley
Song recordings produced by Brian Eno
Song recordings produced by Flood (producer)
Songs written by Bono
Songs written by the Edge
Songs written by Adam Clayton
Songs written by Larry Mullen Jr.
1993 songs